Eliakim Coulibaly (born 5 May 2002) is an Ivorian tennis player.

Coulibaly has a career high ATP singles ranking of 479 achieved on 17 October 2022. He also has a career high ATP doubles ranking of 613 achieved on 3 October 2022. 

Coulibaly also played juniors and reach a career high ranking of 16 on January 6, 2020 and posted a win-loss record of 85–36 in singles and 45–34 in doubles.

Coulibaly represents Ivory Coast at the Davis Cup, where he has a W/L record of 2–0.

Coulibaly began his tennis career training in Abidjan before moving to Casablanca at the age of 12. He currently lives in the south of France and trains at the Mouratoglou Tennis Academy. Coulibaly is a top prospect for African tennis, as he and South African Khololwam Montsi became the first African duo to reach the top 20 in the ITF juniors rankings.

ATP Challenger and ITF World Tennis Tour finals

Singles: 7 (5 titles, 2 runner-up)

Doubles: 2 (1 title, 1 runner-up)

References

External links

2002 births
Living people
Ivorian male tennis players